Stefano Patriarca (born July 23, 1987) is an Italian volleyball player, playing in position middle blocker. Since the 2020/2021 season, he has played for BCC Castellana Grotte.

Sporting achievements

Clubs 
CEV Challenge Cup:
  2006
Italian Championship:
  2006, 2014
Italian SuperCup:
  2006
CEV Cup:
  2013

National Team 
Boys' U19 World Championship:
  2005

References

External links
 LegaVolley profile
 Volleybox profile
 FIVB profile
 CEV profile

1987 births
Living people
Italian men's volleyball players